This page provides the party lists put forward in New Zealand's 2008 general election. Party lists determine (in the light of country-wide proportional voting) the appointment of list MPs under the mixed-member proportional (MMP) representation electoral system. Electoral law required submission of all party lists for this particular election by 14 October 2008.

Successful parties

ACT 

Sources: Elections New Zealand. Party Lists of Successful Registered Parties (2008), Party Lists of Successful Registered Parties (2005), Electorate Candidate and Party Votes Recorded at Each Polling Place (2008)

Green Party 

Sources: Elections New Zealand. Party Lists of Successful Registered Parties (2008), Party Lists of Successful Registered Parties (2005), Electorate Candidate and Party Votes Recorded at Each Polling Place (2008)

Labour Party 

Sources: Elections New Zealand. Party Lists of Successful Registered Parties (2008), Party Lists of Successful Registered Parties (2005), Electorate Candidate and Party Votes Recorded at Each Polling Place (2008)

Māori Party 

Sources: Elections New Zealand. Party Lists of Successful Registered Parties (2008), Party Lists of Successful Registered Parties (2005), Electorate Candidate and Party Votes Recorded at Each Polling Place (2008)

National Party 

Sources: Elections New Zealand. Party Lists of Successful Registered Parties (2008), Party Lists of Successful Registered Parties (2005), Electorate Candidate and Party Votes Recorded at Each Polling Place (2008)

Progressive Party 

Sources: Elections New Zealand. Party Lists of Successful Registered Parties (2008), Party Lists of Successful Registered Parties (2005), Electorate Candidate and Party Votes Recorded at Each Polling Place (2008)

United Future 

Sources: Elections New Zealand. Party Lists of Successful Registered Parties (2008), Party Lists of Successful Registered Parties (2005), Electorate Candidate and Party Votes Recorded at Each Polling Place (2008)

Unsuccessful parties

Alliance 

Sources: Elections New Zealand. Party Lists of Unsuccessful Registered Parties (2008), Party Lists of Unsuccessful Registered Parties (2005), Electorate Candidate and Party Votes Recorded at Each Polling Place (2008)

Bill and Ben Party 

Sources: Elections New Zealand. Party Lists of Unsuccessful Registered Parties (2008), Electorate Candidate and Party Votes Recorded at Each Polling Place (2008)

Democrats for Social Credit 

Sources: Elections New Zealand. Party Lists of Unsuccessful Registered Parties (2008), Party Lists of Unsuccessful Registered Parties (2005), Electorate Candidate and Party Votes Recorded at Each Polling Place (2008)

Family Party 

Sources: Elections New Zealand. Party Lists of Unsuccessful Registered Parties (2008), Electorate Candidate and Party Votes Recorded at Each Polling Place (2008)

Kiwi Party 

Sources: Elections New Zealand. Party Lists of Unsuccessful Registered Parties (2008), Electorate Candidate and Party Votes Recorded at Each Polling Place (2008)

Legalise Cannabis Party 

Sources: Elections New Zealand. Party Lists of Unsuccessful Registered Parties (2008), Party Lists of Unsuccessful Registered Parties (2005), Electorate Candidate and Party Votes Recorded at Each Polling Place (2008)

Libertarianz 

Sources: Elections New Zealand. Party Lists of Unsuccessful Registered Parties (2008), Party Lists of Unsuccessful Registered Parties (2005), Electorate Candidate and Party Votes Recorded at Each Polling Place (2008)

New Zealand First 

Sources: Elections New Zealand. Party Lists of Unsuccessful Registered Parties (2008), Party Lists of Successful Registered Parties (2005), Electorate Candidate and Party Votes Recorded at Each Polling Place (2008)

Pacific Party 

Sources: Elections New Zealand. Party Lists of Successful Registered Parties (2008), Electorate Candidate and Party Votes Recorded at Each Polling Place (2008)

Residents Action Movement 

Sources: Elections New Zealand. Party Lists of Unsuccessful Registered Parties (2008), Electorate Candidate and Party Votes Recorded at Each Polling Place (2008)

Republic of New Zealand Party 

Sources: Elections New Zealand. Party Lists of Unsuccessful Registered Parties (2008), Party Lists of Unsuccessful Registered Parties (2005), Electorate Candidate and Party Votes Recorded at Each Polling Place (2008)

Workers Party 

Sources: Elections New Zealand. Party Lists of Unsuccessful Registered Parties (2008), Electorate Candidate and Party Votes Recorded at Each Polling Place (2008)

References

External links
 Official lists (with party logos)

2008 New Zealand general election
Lists of New Zealand political candidates
Party lists